The 1890 North Dakota gubernatorial election was held on November 4, 1890. Republican nominee Andrew H. Burke defeated Democratic nominee William N. Roach with 52.23% of the vote.

General election

Candidates
Major party candidates
Andrew H. Burke, Republican
F. M. Kinter, Democratic

Other candidates
Walter Muir, Independent

Results

References

1890
North Dakota
Gubernatorial